Roderick Marcus Epps (born January 16, 1995) is an American soccer player who currently plays as a winger for FC Tulsa in the USL Championship.

Career

Youth and college 
Epps played four years of college soccer at the University of South Florida between 2013 and 2016, making 75 appearances and scoring 8 goals.

While at college, Epps also appeared for Premier Development League side Chicago Fire U-23 in 2014 and 2015.

Professional

Philadelphia Union
On January 13, 2017, Epps was selected 25th overall in the 2017 MLS SuperDraft by Philadelphia Union. He signed with the club on February 6, 2017. Epps made his professional debut on April 1, 2017, while on loan with the Union's United Soccer League affiliate Bethlehem Steel, playing 90 minutes in a 3–2 loss to Rochester Rhinos. On May 27, 2017 Epps made his MLS debut, appearing as a second half substitute in a 1–0 loss to Real Salt Lake. Epps scored his first goal as a professional on June 14, 2017, helping Philadelphia to a 3–1 victory over Harrisburg City Islanders in the Lamar Hunt U.S. Open Cup. On July 26, 2017 he scored his first league goal in a 3–0 victory over Columbus Crew.

New York Red Bulls
On December 12, 2018, Epps was selected by New York Red Bulls as the first pick in the MLS Waiver Draft. New York traded a second-round pick in the 2019 MLS SuperDraft to San Jose Earthquakes in exchange for the first pick in the Waiver Draft. On March 2, 2019, Epps made his debut with the club, appearing as a starter in a 1-1 draw with Columbus Crew on the opening day of the season.

During the 2019 season Epps was sent on loan to New York Red Bulls II and on March 9, 2019 in his first match with the side, scored one goal and assisted on another in a 3–1 victory over Swope Park Rangers.

On August 2, 2019, Epps was loaned to USL Championship side Memphis 901 FC.

Portland Timbers 2
Following his release from New York at the end of the 2019 season, Epps joined USL Championship side Portland Timbers 2.

San Antonio FC
Epps signed with USL Championship side San Antonio FC on January 22, 2021. Epps led San Antonio in games started, games played, and minutes played in a season that saw SAFC reach the Western Conference Finals.

Phoenix Rising FC
In December 2021, Epps signed a multi-year contract with Phoenix Rising FC.

FC Tulsa
On July 27, 2022, Epps was traded to FC Tulsa in exchange for forward JJ Williams.

Career statistics

References

External links
 

1995 births
Living people
American soccer players
Association football midfielders
Philadelphia Union II players
Chicago Fire U-23 players
New York Red Bulls players
New York Red Bulls II players
Memphis 901 FC players
Portland Timbers 2 players
San Antonio FC players
Phoenix Rising FC players
FC Tulsa players
Major League Soccer players
Philadelphia Union draft picks
Philadelphia Union players
Soccer players from Mississippi
South Florida Bulls men's soccer players
Sportspeople from Jackson, Mississippi
USL Championship players
USL League Two players